Japan Open  may refer to:

Japan Open (badminton)
Japan Open Golf Championship
Japan Women's Open Golf Championship
Japan Open (tennis)
Japan Open (darts)
Japan Open (figure skating)
Japan Open (table tennis)
Japan Open International Wheelchair Tennis Championships